A college town or university town is a settlement dominated by a university community. It may also refer to

 College Park, South Australia, formerly known as College Town
 College Town, Berkshire, England
 Collegetown, commercial district of Ithaca, New York
 Any of various housing or mixed-use developments serving particular university communities
 Any of various town and gown relations programs

See also
 College City
 College Hill
 College Park
 College Township (disambiguation)
 University City
 University Hill
 University Park
 University town (disambiguation)